Bruno Chersicla (10 October 1937 – 3 May 2013) was an Italian painter and sculptor.

Biography 
Bruno Chersicla studied at the Istituto Statale d'Arte per l'Arredamento e la Decorazione della Nave e degli Interni (a State arts institute) in Trieste. He realized his first informal works in 1958. In the 1950s he also realizes works on the liner ships SS Aurelia, SS Galileo Galilei, SS Raffaello, SS Eugenio C and SS Oceanic.

In the 1960s he is among the founders of the Triestan group Raccordosei, and he realizes the sets and costumes for the Teatro Stabile di Prosa in Trieste and for the Piccolo Teatro in Milan, where he lives since 1966. The production of informal works is followed from the end of the 1960' by an experimental period in the construction of wooden polychrome structures entitled baroki. In the 1970s the abstract solutions are complemented by a kind of representation of geometrical forms, Lezione di Geometria (lesson of geometry) and later, with the work Spitzenkongress, Chersicla starts to realize portraits in particular of personalities of the avant-garde culture who shaped his identity: Klee, Tàpies, Svevo, Joyce, Klimt, Depero.

In 1982, year of the centenary of Joyce, he realizes drawings and sculptures in Trieste for È tornato Joyce (Joyce is back). In 1986 he realizes some large-scale works that are the symbols of the city of Trieste for the exhibition Trouver Trieste at the Conciergerie and at the Centre Beaubourg in Paris. Shortly before passing away he exhibited again in Paris, in 2010, at Gallerie Barès. From 1992 on he participates to the completion of the Annunciazione Church in Pregallo di Lesmo (Province of Monza and Brianza) with the sculpture of the Annunciation behind the Altar, the confessional and the stations of the Via Crucis.

In 1990, Bruno Chersicla joined the group of artists called “Group of 5” (Canu, Chersicla, Francone, Maggio, Noetico/Walter Noetico) of the Neoilluminist Art Movement, created by sculptor Walter Noetico.   For this occasion, he participated with this Neoilluminist Group in a public exhibition organised by the municipality of Sarnano (Italy);  the catalogue of the Exhibition was presented by the Philosopher Silvio Ceccato.

He presents a big anthological exhibition in 1994 in Reggio Emilia and in 1997 in the Museo Rivoltella in Trieste. In 2001 he sets a Guinness World Record for the world's largest painting on the Piazza dell'Unità Italiana in Trieste.

Some of his major exhibitions took place in North America, e.g. Atlanta, Chicago, Miami, New York, and Toronto.

Awards 
 2008 Premio delle Arti Premio della Cultura di Milano
 2009 Premio San Giusto d'Oro a Trieste

Publications 
 È tornato Joyce: iconografia triestina per Zois, con una prefazione di Giancarlo Vigorelli e un commentario di Stelio Crise, Nuova Rivista Europea (NRE), Milano, 1982
Trailers, Ed. Spriano, Omegna, 1985
Europa a lapis, prefazione di Pier Luigi Gerosa. Ed. Il Capricorno, Bormio, 1986
Il viaggio, Ed. Spriano, Omegna, 1987
Veicoli, Ed. Spriano, Omegna, 1987
Tropos, Metafore pubblicitarie, prefazione di Vincenzo Guarracino. Ed. Spriano, Omegna, 1990
Teatro fu Canossa, Commentario di Leopoldo Paciscopi. Edizioni La Scaletta, San Polo d’Enza, 1992
Teodelinda – Una regina per Monza, testi di Renato Mambretti e Paola Scaglione. Ass. Pro Monza, Monza, 1996
24h – Indice dei gesti ricorrenti, Ed.Donati galleria libreria, Crevalcore, 1999
Café, Testo di Vincenzo Guarracino. Ed. Seregn de la Memoria, Seregno, 2000
Nel parco di Miramare : dodici alberi esotici: ritratti da Bruno Chersicla / portrayed by Bruno Chersicla, Stella, Trieste, N. Bassanese, 2000
Il Collezionista, Testo di Gian Pietro Menzani. Ed. Galleria Galliata, Alassio, 2005
Basilica di San Pietro al Monte, Adelchi e il cinghiale, prefazione di Piergiorgio Mandelli. Cattaneo Ed. Oggiono, 2008
Trieste 24 ipotesi di realtà, prefazione di Rossella Fabiani. GR Edizioni, Besana in Brianza, 2010

References

External links 
Beni Culturali Lombardia
Beni Culturali Lombardia
LucaniArt Magazine
La fontana di Loano

Svevo e il professor Zois, mercante di gerundii. Trenta ritratti e un'epigrafe
RDM o Ritratti della Mente

1937 births
2013 deaths
Artists from Trieste
20th-century Italian sculptors
20th-century Italian male artists
Italian male sculptors
21st-century Italian sculptors
20th-century Italian painters
Italian male painters
21st-century Italian painters
Italian contemporary artists
21st-century Italian male artists